Brown Sugar is a 1922 British silent romance film directed by Fred Paul and starring Owen Nares, Lillian Hall-Davis and Eric Lewis. It was based on a play by Lady Arthur Lever.

Cast
 Owen Nares – Lord Sloane 
 Lillian Hall-Davis – Stella Deering 
 Eric Lewis – Earl of Knightsbridge 
 Henrietta Watson – Countess of Knightsbridge 
 Cyril Dane – Edmundson 
 Margaret Halstan – Honoria Nesbitt 
 Louise Hampton – Miss Gibson 
 Gladys Harvey – Mrs. Cunningham 
 Eric Leighton – Crowbie Carruthers

References

External links

1922 films
British silent feature films
British romance films
Films directed by Fred Paul
British films based on plays
Films produced by G. B. Samuelson
British black-and-white films
1920s romance films
1920s English-language films
1920s British films